Leiocephalus rhutidira, commonly known as the Haitian black-throated curlytail or Lapierre curlytail lizard, is a species of lizard in the family Leiocephalidae (curly-tailed lizard). It is native to Haiti.

References

Leiocephalus
Reptiles described in 1979
Reptiles of Haiti
Taxa named by Albert Schwartz (zoologist)